Durham is a railway station on the East Coast Main Line, which runs between  and . It is owned by Network Rail and managed by London North Eastern Railway.

It is managed and served frequently by London North Eastern Railway (as a stop on the East Coast Main Line). It is also served by CrossCountry, TransPennine Express and Northern trains.

Durham is a through station with two platforms, located north of the city centre, on a hill. South of the station, the railway line is elevated on a viaduct. After a renovation between 2006 and 2008, the original stone station building is now the ticket hall.

History 
The city of Durham has been served by four stations, only one of which survives today:
Shincliffe (called Shincliffe Town from 1861): located in nearby Shincliffe, this station was built in 1839 and was served by the Durham and Sunderland Railway, using rope haulage until 1856. It closed when Elvet station opened in the city centre. A second station, Shincliffe, on the Leamside to Ferryhill line, was opened in 1844. That closed to passengers in 1941.
Durham (Gilesgate): opened in 1844, and within the city boundaries, it was served by a branch from Belmont on the Leamside Line, then the main line from London to Newcastle. Passenger services finished in 1857 with the opening of the current station on the branch from Leamside to Bishop Auckland but it continued in use as a goods shed until final closure in 1966. Today it has been redeveloped as a Travelodge hotel, while the serving track was used in the realignment of the A690 Gilesgate bypass road.
The station was redeveloped in 1871, when the North Eastern Railway developed a new line from Tursdale through Relly Mill Junction to Durham, and onwards from Newton Hall Junction through Chester-le-Street to Newcastle Central via the Team Valley. This became the main line, the current East Coast Main Line on 15 January 1872.
Durham (Elvet): in 1893, the Durham-Sunderland branch was diverted from Shincliffe Town to a new station at Elvet, within the city boundary. It closed to regular passenger services in 1931 and fully closed in 1953.

On grouping in 1923, the stations came under the control of the London and North Eastern Railway. Passenger services to Bishop Auckland and Sunderland via Penshaw were withdrawn by British Railways under the Beeching cuts, on 4 May 1964.

The East Coast Main Line through Durham was electrified in 1991.

Station Masters

Edmund Page ca. 1873  - 1882
Joseph Pattison 1900 - 1907
William Curley 1907 - 1917 (afterwards station master at Sunderland) 
William Parker 1917 - 1922 (afterwards station master at Harrogate)
J.C. Pigg 1922 - 1925  (formerly station master at Bishop Auckland, afterwards station master at Bedlington)
Edmund Maleham 1925 - 1926 (removed because of support for the General Strike)
J.A. Simpson 1926 - 1946

Current facilities

Today, the station is owned by LNER and managed by London North Eastern Railway (LNER). It was refurbished between 2006 and 2008 by the operator Great North Eastern Railway (GNER) and later National Express East Coast (NXEC), which included a new passenger lounge, toilets, travel centre, glazed waiting area, lifts and shops. The entrance and ticket hall were moved from the "temporary" 1960s building into the original stone building following renovation and repairs. The works were completed in early 2008 and the newly renovated station won "Best Medium Station" and "Overall Station of the Year" at the 2008 National Rail Awards. Ticket barriers were installed in 2009.

After winning the intercity east coast rail franchise, former operator Virgin Trains East Coast (VTEC)  opened an information office on platform 2, added new benches and perch seating and installed Wi-Fi connection. In 2017, all ticket barriers were removed as part of Virgin Trains East Coast's (VTEC) franchise commitment.

A Brompton Bicycle hire scheme was planned to open in 2018 - however since the demise of Virgin Trains East Coast (VTEC) the management of the station has since passed on to London North Eastern Railway (LNER).

Durham County Council, working with the North East Local Enterprise Partnership, have completed a project to improve cycle routes and pedestrian access to the station from the north of the city. This involved the construction of a new cycle path as well as upgrades to road crossings on Framwellgate path.

In order to accommodate the new London North Eastern Railway Class 800 and 801 Azuma trains that entered service in mid 2019, platform 1 was extended north to a total length of 230 metres.

Services 

Train services are provided by four companies: London North Eastern Railway (LNER), CrossCountry, TransPennine Express and Northern Trains.

CrossCountry operates services on the Cross Country Route. There are also two daily services that continue beyond Edinburgh to Dundee, of which one is further extended to Aberdeen.

TransPennine Express serves the station with two trains an hour each way.

Notes

See also
Durham Viaduct

References

External links 
 
 

Railway stations in County Durham
DfT Category C1 stations
Former North Eastern Railway (UK) stations
Railway stations in Great Britain opened in 1857
Railway stations served by CrossCountry
Railway stations served by TransPennine Express
Northern franchise railway stations
Railway stations served by London North Eastern Railway
Buildings and structures in Durham, England
Thomas Prosser railway stations
1857 establishments in England